WECQ (92.1 MHz) is a commercial FM radio station licensed to Destin, Florida, and serving Fort Walton Beach and the Emerald Coast. Owned and operated by JVC Broadcasting, it features an active rock radio format.

WECQ has an effective radiated power (ERP) of 19,000 watts.  The transmitter is off Hollywood Boulevard NW in Fort Walton Beach.

History
The station signed on the air in 1981 as WMMK. In 2004, the call sign changed to WWRK, and changed again the following year to WFFY. The station has served the area as a Rhythmic Top 40 station since then, at first branded as Fly 92.1. On December 21, 2011, station owner Quantum Broadcasting sold its stations in the Ft. Walton Beach market, including WFFY, to Apex Broadcasting. On February 17, 2012, at 5 PM CST after playing "Stay Fly" by Three 6 Mafia, Apex dropped the Fly 92.1 branding and relaunched WFFY as CHR Q92, with Kelly Clarkson's Stronger the first song played. The call sign was later changed to WECQ to reflect the change in branding.

Apex Broadcasting sold WECQ — along with sister stations WHWY, WWAV, and WZLB — to Community Broadcasters effective December 1, 2016, at a purchase price of $5.9 million.

On December 22, 2020, Community Broadcasters sold the entire Fort Walton Beach cluster to JVC Broadcasting for almost $2.3 million, which later closed on February 1, 2021.

On August 24, 2021, WECQ went jockless and began promoting that "changes" would be coming to the station on September 1 at noon. At that time, after again playing Stronger by Kelly Clarkson (as a near-bookend to the format's launch), followed by "Good Riddance (Time of Your Life)" by Green Day, the station changed their format to active rock, branded as "Rock 92.1"; the format had been revealed by JVC on the 30th of the month, and carries a typical active rock playlist, along with a decent amount of guitar-based alternative rock crossover songs, with Foo Fighters (whose song "Monkey Wrench" was the first under the new format), Van Halen, Mammoth WVH, Shinedown, The Offspring, Led Zeppelin and Incubus listed as artists to be heard.

Staff

The station’s inaugural lineup as "Rock 92.1" will include OM/PD Woofy Ramone in middays and JT in afternoons from 2-7pm. Outside those shifts, the station will launch with a jockless “More Music Mornings” presentation.

References

External links
WECQ official website

ECQ
Radio stations established in 1981
1981 establishments in Florida
Active rock radio stations in the United States